Fiachnae mac Demmáin (died 627) was King of Ulaid from 626 to 627. He sometimes was called Fiachnae Dubtuinne. He was a member of the Dal Fiatach and nephew of Baetan mac Cairill (died 581) of Ulaid. He was the son of Demmán mac Cairell (died 572). He succeeded his uncle as king of the Dal Fiatach in 581.

His first mention in the Irish annals is the battle of Cúl Caíl (possibly Kilkeel, modern County Down) in 601 where he was defeated by Fiachnae mac Baetain of the Dal nAraide. The annals mention Fiachnae mac Baetan went against him so was probably the aggressor. This was part of the struggle of these two rival clans for the overlordship of Ulaid. In 626  was fought the Battle of Leithit Midind at Drung (Knocklayd, modern County Antrim) between these two rivals at which Fiachnae mac Demmáin was the victor and Fiachnae mac Baetan was slain. The annals say the battle was fought by him which implies he was the aggressor.

He now becomes King of Ulaid but was himself defeated and slain by the King of Dalriada, Connad Cerr at the Battle of Ard Corainn in 627. The Annals of Clonmacnoise claim that this was in revenge for the slaying of Fiachnae mac Baetan.

His wives were:

Cumne Dub, daughter of Furudrán mac Béicce of the Uí Tuirtri.She was the mother of Dúnchad mac Fiachnai (died circa 644),a king of Ulaid and of a daughter Dub Lacha who married Mongán mac Fiachnai (died 625), the son of his rival Fiachnae mac Baetan.

Cumne(Cummíne) Find, daughter of Báetán Cáech of DalnAraide and sister of Fiachnae mac Baetan. She was the mother of Máel Cobo mac Fiachnae (died 647), a king of Ulaid and a son named Suibne.

He was ancestor of all later Dal Fiatach kings.

Notes

See also
Kings of Ulster

References

 Byrne, Francis John (2001), Irish Kings and High-Kings, Dublin: Four Courts Press, 
 Charles-Edwards, T. M. (2000), Early Christian Ireland, Cambridge: Cambridge University Press,  
 Gearoid Mac Niocaill (1972), Ireland before the Vikings, Dublin: Gill and Macmillan
 Dáibhí Ó Cróinín (2005), A New History of Ireland, Volume One, Oxford: Oxford University Press

External links
CELT: Corpus of Electronic Texts at University College Cork

Kings of Ulster
627 deaths
7th-century Irish monarchs
People from County Antrim
Year of birth unknown